Institución is one of the 5 subbarrios of Universidad, itself one of 18 barrios of San Juan, Puerto Rico.

References

Universidad, San Juan, Puerto Rico
Municipality of San Juan